Plataria is a coastal village and resort in Thesprotia, Epirus region, Greece. It is part of the Syvota municipal unit.

Plataria was part of the former province of Thyamida. It is located south of Igoumenitsa in the homonymous bay. According to the last administrative division (Kallikratis scheme) Plataria is the seat of the municipal unit of Syvota of the municipality of Igoumenitsa. Its population in 1928 was 128 inhabitants and in 2011 it numbered 961 inhabitants. Since 1930 Plataria has a high school.

Plataria is a classic example of a highly developed touristic area with many beautiful features. The Plataria bay stretches from very near the start of Egnatia Highway and terminates close to Syvota.

There are two versions regarding the origin of the name “Plataria”: 1) The first version is that Plataria is named as such because of the presence of the plain area. In Greek, «πλατύ» means plain area, hence “Πλαταριά». 2) The second version is that Plataria was named after an old large plane tree («πλάτανος» in Greek), which exists today and a small portion of it is still preserved.

Plataria is known for its cultural heritage and features are many organizations and institutes, amongst which the Folklore Museum of Plataria and the Lending Library of Plataria, which operate under the auspices of the Cultural Union of Plataria.

References

Resorts in Greece
Populated places in Thesprotia